State Route 574 (SR 574) is a short state highway located around the southwest side of the Senecaville Lake in eastern Ohio.  in length, it runs from SR 566 in Seneca Township, Noble County to SR 313 in Richland Township, Guernsey County just to the east of Senecaville. The route provides access to homes, recreational facilities, and the main dam in the vicinity of the lake.

Route description
SR 574 begins at a stop-controlled T-intersection at SR 566 in northern Seneca Township. The route heads northeast through mostly forest with an occasional driveway for lake access. The road curves to the northwest after entering Wayne Township, passing the main entrance road for the Seneca Lake State Park. Shortly after the access road, the state route descends in elevation to a small village with a cluster of houses and turns onto the top of the Senecaville Dam. The route enters Guernsey County and is now on the top of the earthen dam. After crossing the dam's main spillway, SR 574 intersects the driveway to the Senecaville Lake Fish Hatchery. The route finishes crossing the dam, passes a small baseball field, and ends at SR 313 in Richland Township.

History
The route was first brought into the state highway system as a dirt road around 1947. The entire route was asphalt-paved by 1958. Since its first designation, it has always followed the same route between SR 566 and SR 313 around the lake.

Major intersections

References

574
Transportation in Noble County, Ohio
Transportation in Guernsey County, Ohio